Hejazi Arabic or Hijazi Arabic (HA), also known as West Arabian Arabic, is a variety of Arabic spoken in the Hejaz region in Saudi Arabia. Strictly speaking, there are two main groups of dialects spoken in the Hejaz region, one by the urban population, originally spoken mainly in the cities of Jeddah, Mecca, Medina and partially in Ta'if and another dialect by the urbanized rural and bedouin populations. However, the term most often applies to the urban variety which is discussed in this article.

In antiquity, the Hejaz was home to the Old Hejazi dialect of Arabic recorded in the consonantal text of the Qur'an. Old Hejazi is distinct from modern Hejazi Arabic, and represents an older linguistic layer wiped out by centuries of migration, but which happens to share the imperative prefix vowel /a-/ with the modern dialect.

Classification 
Also referred to as the sedentary Hejazi dialect, this is the form most commonly associated with the term "Hejazi Arabic", and is spoken in the urban centers of the region, such as Jeddah, Mecca, and Medina. With respect to the axis of bedouin versus sedentary dialects of the Arabic language, this dialect group exhibits features of both. Like other sedentary dialects, the urban Hejazi dialect is less conservative than the bedouin varieties in some aspects and has therefore shed some Classical forms and features that are still present in bedouin dialects, these include gender-number disagreement, and the feminine marker -n (see Varieties of Arabic).

Innovative features 

 Loss of the final  sound in the 3rd person masculine singular pronoun .
All numbers have no gender except for the number "one" which is  m.  and  f. .
(See Hejazi Arabic Phonology)
loss of gender-specificity in plural verb forms, e.g.   instead of masculine   and feminine  .
loss of gender-specificity in plural adjectives, e.g.   "bored" can be used to describe both feminine and masculine plural nouns.
The verb forms V, VI and IIQ have an additional initial  , e.g.   "it shattered" (V),   "she worked" (VI) and   "they babbled" (IIQ).

Conservative features 
 Hejazi Arabic does not employ double negation, nor does it append the negation particles -sh to negate verbs: Hejazi   ("I don't know"), as opposed to Egyptian   and Palestinian  .
 The prohibitive mood of Classical Arabic is preserved in the imperative:   ("don't go").
 The possessive suffixes are generally preserved in their Classical forms. For example,   "your (pl) house".
 The glottal stop can be added to final syllables ending in a vowel as a way of emphasising.
the definite article  is always pronounced  as opposed to Egyptian or Kuwaiti  and the final  is always pronounced .
 Compared to neighboring dialects, urban Hejazi retains most of the short vowels of Classical Arabic with no vowel reduction (ghawa syndrome), for example:
   ("our pocket"), as opposed to bedouin  and Egyptian .
   ("she hit him"), as opposed to bedouin .
   ("his son"), as opposed to bedouin .
   ("in your possession" pl.), as opposed to bedouin , Egyptian , and Levantine .
  ("on me"), as opposed to bedouin .

History 
The Arabic of today is derived principally from the old dialects of Central and North Arabia which were divided by the classical Arab grammarians into three groups: Hejaz, Najd, and the language of the tribes in adjoining areas. Though the modern Hejazi dialects has developed markedly since the development of Classical Arabic, and Modern Standard Arabic is quite distinct from the modern dialect of Hejaz. Standard Arabic now differs considerably from modern Hejazi Arabic in terms of its phonology, morphology, syntax, and lexicon, such diglossia in Arabic began to emerge at the latest in the sixth century CE when oral poets recited their poetry in a proto-Classical Arabic based on archaic dialects which differed greatly from their own.

Urban Hejazi Arabic belongs to the western Peninsular Arabic branch of the Arabic language, which itself is a Semitic language. It includes features of both urban and bedouin dialects given its development in the historical cities of Jeddah, Medina and Mecca in proximity to the bedouin tribes that lived on the outskirts of these cities, in addition to a minimal influence in vocabulary from other urban Arabic dialects and Modern Standard Arabic, and more recently the influence of the other dialects of Saudi Arabia, all of which made Urban Hejazi a dialect that is distinctly unique but close to  peninsular dialects on one hand and urban Arabic dialects on the other.

Historically, it is not well known in which stage of Arabic the shift from the Proto-Semitic pair  qāf and  gīm came to be Hejazi  gāf and jīm , although it has been attested as early as the eighth century CE, and it can be explained by a chain shift * →  →  that occurred in one of two ways:

 Push Chain: Proto-Semitic qāf * changed to Hejazi  gāf first, which resulted in pushing the original gīm  forward in articulation to become Hejazi  jīm, but since most modern qāf dialects as well as standard Arabic also have jīm, hence the push-chain of qāf to gāf first can be discredited, although there are good grounds for believing that old Arabic qāf had both voiced  and voiceless  allophones; and after that gīm  was fronted to  jīm, possibly as a result of pressure from the allophones.

* The original value of Proto-Semitic qāf was probably an emphatic  not .

Phonology 
In general, Hejazi native phonemic inventory consists of 26 (with no interdental ) to 28 consonant phonemes depending on the speaker's background and formality, in addition to the marginal phoneme  and two foreign phonemes  ⟨پ⟩ and  ⟨ڤ⟩ used by a number of speakers. Furthermore, it has an eight-vowel system, consisting of three short and five long vowels , in addition to two diphthongs . Consonant length and Vowel length are both distinctive and being a Semitic language the four emphatic consonants  are treated as separate phonemes from their plain counterparts.

Hejazi  'new'  vs. Gulf Arabic  and Hejazi  'with you'  vs. traditional Najdi .

Unlike other neighboring dialects;  is not velarized in certain positions, as in  'brain' pronounced with a light Lām  in Hejazi and velarized one  in other peninsular Arabic dialects.

Consonants 

Phonetic notes:
 is an optional allophone for ⟨ظ⟩.
 ⟨پ⟩ and  ⟨ڤ⟩ which exist only in foreign words, are used by a number of speakers and can be substituted by  ⟨ب⟩ and  ⟨ف⟩ respectively depending on the speaker, in general  ⟨ڤ⟩ seems to be integrated and used by most speakers.
The cluster also occurs phonetically in native words affected by syncope when connected, e.g.

Vowels 

Phonetic notes:
('Chicago') which is less likely to be pronounced .

Monophthongization 

Not all instances of mid vowels are a result of monophthongization, some are from grammatical processes   'they said'  →    'they said to her' (opposed to Classical Arabic   ), and some occur in modern Portmanteau words e.g.   'why?' (from Classical Arabic   'for what' and   'thing').

Vocabulary 
Hejazi vocabulary derives primarily from Arabic Semitic roots. The urban Hejazi vocabulary differs in some respect from that of other dialects in the Arabian Peninsula. For example, there are fewer specialized terms related to desert life, and more terms related to seafaring and fishing. Loanwords are uncommon and they are mainly of French, Italian, Persian, Turkish and most recently of English origins, and due to the diverse origins of the inhabitants of Hejazi cities, some loanwords are only used by some families. Some old loanwords are fading or became obsolete due to the influence of Modern Standard Arabic and their association with lower social class and education, e.g.   "air conditioner" (from English Condition) was replaced by Standard Arabic  .

Most of the loanwords tend to be nouns e.g.   "Bicycle",   "lipstick" and   "shrimp", and sometimes with a change of meaning as in:   "overpass" from Turkish  originally meaning "bridge" and   "water tanker truck" from English  and   "shoe" from Turkish  originally meaning "boot", loaned verbs which are less common include   "to hack" from English "" and   "to agitate" from French "" or English "".

(see vocabulary list)

Portmanteau 
A common feature in Hejazi vocabulary is portmanteau words (also called a blend in linguistics); in which parts of multiple words or their phones (sounds) are combined into a new word, it is especially innovative in making Interrogative words, examples include:

Numerals 
The Cardinal number system in Hejazi is much more simplified than the Classical Arabic

 for numbers 11 and above the noun following the number is in singular form as in:-
 other numbers are simply added to the singular form of the noun   ('21 books').

Grammar

Subject pronouns 
In Hejazi Arabic, personal pronouns have eight forms. In singular, the 2nd and 3rd persons differentiate gender, while the 1st person and plural do not.

{| class="wikitable"
|+ Negative subject pronouns
! colspan="2" | Person
! Singular
! Plural
|-
! colspan="2" | 1st
|  ماني/مني| colspan=2 style="text-align: center;"| محنا |-
! rowspan="2" | 2nd
! masculine
|  َمنت | rowspan="2" |  منتو |-
! feminine
|  منتي
|-
! rowspan="2" | 3rd
! masculine
|  مهو 
| rowspan="2" |  ماهم/مهم|-
! feminine
|  مهي |}

 Verbs 
Hejazi Arabic verbs, as with the verbs in other Semitic languages, and the entire vocabulary in those languages, are based on a set of three, four, or even five consonants (but mainly three consonants) called a root (triliteral or quadriliteral according to the number of consonants). The root communicates the basic meaning of the verb, e.g.  'to write',  'to eat'. Changes to the vowels in between the consonants, along with prefixes or suffixes, specify grammatical functions such as :
 Two tenses (past, present; present progressive is indicated by the prefix (bi-), future is indicated by the prefix (ħa-))
 Two voices (active, passive)
 Two genders (masculine, feminine)
 Three persons (first, second, third)
 Two numbers (singular, plural)
Hejazi has two grammatical number in verbs (Singular and Plural) instead of the Classical (Singular, Dual and Plural), in addition to a present progressive tense which was not part of the Classical Arabic grammar. In contrast to other urban dialects the prefix (b-) is only used for present continuous as in   "he is writing" while the habitual tense is without a prefix as in   "I love you" f. unlike  in Egyptian and Levantine dialects and the future tense is indicated by the prefix (ħa-) as in   "we will run".

 Regular verbs 
The most common verbs in Hejazi have a given vowel pattern for past (a and i) to present (a or u or i). Combinations of each exist:

According to Arab grammarians, verbs are divided into three categories; Past ماضي, Present  and Imperative . An example from the root  the verb katabt/ʼaktub 'i wrote/i write' (which is a regular sound verb):

While present progressive and future are indicated by adding the prefix (b-) and (ħa-) respectively to the present (indicative) :

 The verbs highlighted in silver sometimes come in irregular forms e.g. حبيت (ħabbē)-t "i loved", حبينا (ħabbē)-na "we loved" but ّحب (ħabb) "he loved" and حبُّوا (ħabb)-u "they loved".
 additional final ا to ـوا   in all plural verbs is silent.
While if the verb ends in ـى or ـا  in its past simple form as in  šawa 'he grilled' (present  yišwi 'he grills') it becomes  šawēt 'I grilled' and  šawat 'she grilled and  šawu 'they grilled'.

Example: katabt/aktub "write": non-finite forms

Active participles act as adjectives, and so they must agree with their subject. An active participle can be used in several ways:
 to describe a state of being (understanding; knowing).
 to describe what someone is doing right now (going, leaving) as in some verbs like  ("i went") the active participle  ("i'm going") is used instead of present continuous form to give the same meaning of an ongoing action.
 to indicate that someone/something is in a state of having done something (having put something somewhere, having lived somewhere for a period of time).

 Passive Voice 

 Adjectives 
In Hejazi, adjectives, demonstratives and verbs fully agree in gender and number, e.g.   "big boy" and   "big girl". But there are two exceptions; First, there is no agreement in dual number; e.g.   "two girls" takes the plural adjective as in   "two big girls". Second, and more importantly, gender agreement is syncretic in the plural, in which inanimate plural nouns take a feminine singular adjective e.g.   "big cars" instead of the plural adjective, while animate plural nouns take the plural adjective as in   "big girls". The plural feminine adjective   can be used as well but it is rather archaic.

 Pronouns 

 Enclitic pronouns 
Enclitic forms of personal pronouns are suffixes that are affixed to various parts of speech, with varying meanings:

 To the construct state of nouns, where they have the meaning of possessive demonstratives, e.g. "my, your, his".
 To verbs, where they have the meaning of direct object pronouns, e.g. "me, you, him".
 To verbs, where they have the meaning of indirect object pronouns, e.g. "(to/for) me,(to/for) you, (to/for) him".
 To prepositions.

Unlike Egyptian Arabic, in Hejazi no more than one pronoun can be suffixed to a word.

The indirect object pronouns are written separately from the verbs as per Classical Arabic convention, but they are pronounced as if they are fused with the verbs.

General Modifications:-

 as in the noun   ('chair') →   ('his chair'),   ('our chair'),   ('your chair' f.) and the verb   ('we followed') →   ('we followed him'),   ('we followed you' feminine).
 the indirect object pronouns   ('we went') →   ('we went to him').
 as in the noun   ('book') →   ('her book'),   ('their book'),   ('your book' plural),   ('our book') or the verb   ('you knew') →   ('you knew me'),   ('you knew us'),   ('you knew her'),   ('you knew them').

 Hollow Verbs vowel shortening 
Medial vowel shortening occurs in Hollow verbs (verbs with medial vowels ā, ū, ō, ē, ī) when added to Indirect object pronouns:

This does effect past verbs as well but the form of the word does not change, as in   rāḥ ('he went') which is pronounced   ('he went to him!') after adding a pronoun.

 Writing system 
Hejazi does not have a standardized form of writing and mostly follows Classical Arabic rules of writing. The main difference between classical Arabic and Hejazi are the alternations of the Hamza, some verb forms and the final long vowels, this alternation happened since most word-final short vowels from the classical period have been omitted and most word-final unstressed long vowel have been shortened in Hejazi.

Differences Between Classical and Hejazi writing

 Hamza  : 
 Initial hamza holds no phonemic value in Hejazi but it can be used as per Classical Arabic convention, e.g. "sorry" to differentiate it from  /   "regret".
 Added medial long vowels :
 2nd person masculine singular imperative in hollow verbs keep their long vowels as روح  "go!" as opposed to classical   and   "see!" as opposed to classical  .
 Final added   appears in:
 Masculine singular imperative in final-weak verbs, as in   "go!, walk!" as opposed to classical  .
 2nd person feminine singular past verbs, as in   "you forgot" as opposed to classical  .
 Feminine possessive and object pronoun  which occurs after a long vowel, as in   "he gives you" as opposed to classical  .
 Feminine pronouns, as in   "you", as opposed to classical  .
 Innovative forms:
"he spoke" (form V),   "she worked" (form VI) and   "they babbled" (form IIQ).
Portmanteau words have the most alternatives in their spelling since they did not occur in Classical Arabic, so the word for "still"  can be written   or  depending on the writer, all of these forms stemming from the classical  ("to the hour").

Mistakes in Hejazi spelling
 Final silent :
 Writing  instead of final pronoun  as in   "his book" which is mistakenly written .
 Final :
 Adding a final  to final 1st person singular possessive pronoun as in   "on me" written mistakenly written as  even though Classical Arabic have the same form and pronunciation as in عَلَيَّ , other examples include   "with me",   "to me",   "my father" and   "in me".
 Missing final silent  in plural verbs as in   "you threw" or   "they hanged" even though this practice is no longer needed but it follows the Classical Arabic form.

The table below shows the Arabic alphabet letters and their corresponding phonemes in Hejazi:

Notes:

 words with word-medial long vowels that are pronounced short include words before the indirect object pronouns e.g. لي ,له ,لها as in عاد  "he repeated" becomes عاد لهم  "he repeated to them" and  "going to him" becomes  with a shortened  or rarely , outside of this rule only few words have vowel-shortening, e.g. جاي "I'm coming" pronounced /d͡ʒaj/ or less likely /d͡ʒaːj/ which stems from classical  .
  is only used at the end of words and mainly to mark feminine gender for nouns and adjectives with few exceptions (e.g. ; a male noun). phonemically it is silent indicating final /-a/, except when in construct state it is a /t/, which leads to the word-final /-at/. e.g.   'message' →   'Ahmad's message'.
  is silent in word-final in 3rd person masculine singular pronouns and some words, as in   "we saw him" and   "he has" or the heteronym  pronounced  'why?' or  'for him, but it is still maintained in most other nouns as in   "fruits",   "hate" and   "idiot" where it is differentiated from أبلة  "f. teacher". In writing the silent  helps in distinguishing minimal pairs with word-final vowel length contrast   'you want f. vs.   'you want him f..
 The interdental consonants: 

 Rural dialects 
The varieties of Arabic spoken in the smaller towns and by the bedouin tribes in the Hejaz region are relatively under-studied. However, the speech of some tribes shows much closer affinity to other bedouin dialects, particularly those of neighboring Najd, than to those of the urban Hejazi cities. The dialects of northern Hejazi tribes merge into those of Jordan and Sinai, while the dialects in the south merge with those of 'Asir and Najd. Also, not all speakers of these bedouin dialects are figuratively nomadic bedouins; some are simply sedentary sections that live in rural areas, and thus speak dialects similar to those of their bedouin neighbors.

 Al-'Ula 
The dialect of Al-'Ula governorate in the northern part of the Madinah region. ('your foot') becomes  .

 Badr 

See also

 Varieties of Arabic
 Peninsular Arabic

 References 

 Kees Versteegh, The Arabic Language'', NITLE Arab World Project, by the permission of Edinburgh University Press,

Bibliography

External links 
Hijazi Arabic course with audio files

 
Arabic languages
Languages of Saudi Arabia
Languages of Eritrea
Hejaz
Mashriqi Arabic
Peninsular Arabic